Andrew Todd is a New Zealand international lawn bowler.

Bowls career
In 2008 he won the gold medal in the fours at the 2008 World Outdoor Bowls Championship in Christchurch along with Gary Lawson, Russell Meyer and Richard Girvan.

Todd represented New Zealand at the 2010 Commonwealth Games.

He won the 2010 singles title at the New Zealand National Bowls Championships when bowling for the Burnside Bowls Club.

References

External links
 Profile at the New Zealand Olympic Committee website

Living people
New Zealand male bowls players
1966 births
Place of birth missing (living people)
Bowls World Champions
Bowls players at the 2010 Commonwealth Games
Commonwealth Games competitors for New Zealand
20th-century New Zealand people
21st-century New Zealand people